1963 in sports describes the year's events in world sport.

American football
 NFL Championship: the Chicago Bears won 14–10 over the New York Giants at Wrigley Field
 January 29 – First inductees into the Pro Football Hall of Fame are announced
 September 7 –  the Pro Football Hall of Fame opens in Canton, Ohio with 17 charter members.
 Rose Bowl (1962 season):
 The Southern California Trojans won 42–37 over the Wisconsin Badgers to win the college football national championship. This is the first postseason bowl game to feature the #1 and #2 ranked teams in the country.
 AFL Eastern Division Playoff – Boston Patriots win 26–8 over the Buffalo Bills
 AFL Championship – San Diego Chargers win 51–10 over the Boston Patriots on January 5, 1964
 The Heisman Trophy – Roger Staubach, Navy
 Instant replay is used for the first time during the broadcast of the Army–Navy Game.

Association football
 FA Cup final – Manchester United won 3–1 over Leicester City
 August 24 – Founding of the German Football League – Bundesliga

Athletics
 May – Athletics at the 1963 Pan American Games held in São Paulo

Australian rules football
 Victorian Football League
 Geelong wins the 67th VFL Premiership (Geelong 15.19 (109) d Hawthorn 8.12 (60))
 Brownlow Medal awarded to Bob Skilton (South Melbourne)

Bandy

Baseball

 June 22 – Phillies center fielder Tony Gonzalez plays his 200th straight errorless game to help rookie Ray Culp beat Roger Craig and the Mets 2–0.
 World Series – Los Angeles Dodgers win 4 games to 0 over the New York Yankees. The series MVP is Sandy Koufax, Los Angeles.

Basketball
 NCAA Men's Basketball Championship –
 Loyola (Illinois) wins 60–58 over Cincinnati
 NBA Finals –
 Boston Celtics win 4 games to 2 over the Los Angeles Lakers
 Basketball World Championship –
 Brazil World Champion

Boxing
 July 22 – Sonny Liston wins the Heavyweight Championship of the world by knocking out Floyd Patterson in the 1st round of their bout in Las Vegas.
 August 27 to September 7 – Pan American Games held in São Paulo, Brazil.

Canadian football
 Grey Cup – Hamilton Tiger-Cats win 21–10 over the B.C. Lions

Cycling
 Giro d'Italia won by Franco Balmamion of Italy
 Tour de France – Jacques Anquetil of France
 UCI Road World Championships – Men's road race – Benoni Beheyt of Belgium

Figure skating
 World Figure Skating Championships
 Men's champion: Donald McPherson, Canada
 Ladies' champion: Sjoukje Dijkstra, Netherlands
 Pair skating champions: Marika Kilius & Hans-Jürgen Bäumler, Germany
 Ice dancing champions: Eva Romanová & Pavel Roman, Czechoslovakia

Golf
Men's professional
 Masters Tournament – Jack Nicklaus
 U.S. Open – Julius Boros
 British Open – Bob Charles
 PGA Championship – Jack Nicklaus
 PGA Tour money leader – Arnold Palmer – $128,230
 Ryder Cup – United States wins 23 to 9 over Britain in team golf.
Men's amateur
 British Amateur – Michael Lunt
 U.S. Amateur – Deane Beman
Women's professional
 Women's Western Open – Mickey Wright
 LPGA Championship – Mickey Wright
 U.S. Women's Open – Mary Mills
 Titleholders Championship – Marilynn Smith
 LPGA Tour money leader – Mickey Wright – $31,269

Harness racing
 United States Pacing Triple Crown races –
 Cane Pace – Meadow Skipper
 Little Brown Jug – Overtrick
 Messenger Stakes – Overtrick
 Speedy Scot won the Triple Crown of Harness Racing for Triple Crown races –
 Hambletonian – Speedy Scott
 Yonkers Trot – Speedy Scott
 Kentucky Futurity – Speedy Scott
 Australian Inter Dominion Harness Racing Championship –
 Pacers: Cardigan Bay

Horse racing
Steeplechases
 Cheltenham Gold Cup – Mill House
 Grand National – Ayala
Flat races
 Australia – Melbourne Cup won by Gatum Gatum
 Canadian Triple Crown:
 Queen's Plate – Canebora
 Prince of Wales Stakes – Canebora
 Breeders' Stakes – Canebora
 Canebora becomes the country's second Triple Crown winner, and the last until 1989.
 France – Prix de l'Arc de Triomphe won by Exbury
 Ireland – Irish Derby Stakes won by Ragusa
 English Triple Crown:
 2,000 Guineas Stakes – Only for Life
 The Derby – Relko
 St. Leger Stakes – Ragusa
 United States Triple Crown:
 Kentucky Derby – Chateaugay
 Preakness Stakes – Candy Spots
 Belmont Stakes – Chateaugay

Ice Hockey
 Stanley Cup – Toronto Maple Leafs defeat the Detroit Red Wings 4 games to 1.

Motorsport

Radiosport
 Third Amateur Radio Direction Finding European Championship held in Vilnius, Lithuania.

Rugby league
1963 New Zealand rugby league season
1963 NSWRFL season
1962–63 Northern Rugby Football League season / 1963–64 Northern Rugby Football League season

Rugby union
 69th Five Nations Championship series is won by England
 New Zealand All Blacks team tours Great Britain and is defeated only once: 3–0 by Newport RFC on 30 October

Swimming
 July 27 – US swimmer Susan Pitt breaks the world record in the women's 200m butterfly (long course) during a meet in Philadelphia, clocking 2:29.1.

Tennis
Australia
 Australian Men's Singles Championship – Roy Emerson (Australia) defeats Ken Fletcher (Australia) 6–3, 6–3, 6–1
 Australian Women's Singles Championship – Margaret Smith Court (Australia) defeats Jan Lehane O'Neill (Australia) 6–2, 6–2
England
 Wimbledon Men's Singles Championship – Chuck McKinley (USA) defeats Fred Stolle (Australia) 9–7, 6–1, 6–4
 Wimbledon Women's Singles Championship – Margaret Smith Court (Australia) defeats Billie Jean King (USA) 6–3, 6–4
France
 French Men's Singles Championship – Roy Emerson (Australia) defeats Pierre Darmon (France) 3–6, 6–1, 6–4, 6–4
 French Women's Singles Championship – Lesley Turner (Australia) defeats Ann Haydon Jones (Great Britain) 2–6, 6–3, 7–5
USA
 American Men's Singles Championship – Rafael Osuna (Mexico) defeats Frank Froehling (USA) 7–5, 6–4, 6–2
 American Women's Singles Championship – Maria Bueno (Brazil) defeats Margaret Smith (Australia) 7–5, 6–4
Events
 Federation Cup – USA 2–1 Australia (inaugural event)
Davis Cup
 1963 Davis Cup –  3–2  at Memorial Drive Tennis Centre (grass) Adelaide, Australia

Volleyball
 Volleyball at the 1963 Pan American Games in São Paulo won by Brazil (both men's and women's tournaments)

Multi-sport events
 Fourth Pan American Games held in São Paulo, Brazil
 Fourth Mediterranean Games held in Naples, Italy
 Third Summer Universiade held in Porto Alegre, Brazil

Awards
 Associated Press Male Athlete of the Year – Sandy Koufax (Major League Baseball)
 Associated Press Female Athlete of the Year – Mickey Wright (LPGA golf)
 ABC's Wide World of Sports Athlete of the year: Valery Brumel (track and field)
 Sports Illustrated Sportsman of the Year: Pete Rozelle NFL

References

 
Sports by year